John Perkins Sr. (1781-1866) was an American judge and planter.

Biography
Perkins was born on May 17, 1781, in Somerset County, Maryland. His father was an English-born immigrant. He was the owner of a plantation in Vidalia, Louisiana, from 1807 to 1811. He eventually became the owner of "Somerset", an 18,000-acre estate in Madison Parish and Tensas Parish. He married Mrs. Bynum, a widow, in 1818. They had two sons, including John Perkins Jr., a politician, and William Perkins, who died at sea in 1854. After he was widowed, he married Mrs. Seaton of Port Gibson, Mississippi. They resided at "The Briars" in Natchez. Perkins died on November 30, 1866, in Adams County, Mississippi.

References

External links

The John Perkins Family of Northeast Louisiana at RootsWeb.com

1781 births
1866 deaths
American people of English descent
American planters
Burials in Mississippi
People from Somerset County, Maryland
19th-century American judges